The men's 4 × 100 metres relay event at the 2002 African Championships in Athletics was held in Radès, Tunisia on August 8.

Results

References

2002 African Championships in Athletics
Relays at the African Championships in Athletics